Pietro Sighel (born 15 July 1999 in Trento) is a male Italian short track speed skater. He was second in the overall classification at the 2021 European Championships in Gdańsk, where he also secured silver medals in both 500 m and 5000 m relay competitions. He won three bronze medals at the 2021 World Championships in Dordrecht.

His first World Cup successes came during the 2021-22 season. 24 October 2021 he together with Andrea Cassinelli, Yuri Confortola, and Tommaso Dotti finished third in 5000 m men's relay in Beijing. His first personal podium occurred on 28 November 2021 in Dordrecht, where he finished third in 1000 m.

He also competes in speed skating. At the 2019 World Junior Speed Skating Championships in Baselga di Piné, he finished 37th in 1500 m competition and 33rd in 3000 m competition.

He began skating at age four in Baselga di Pinè, Italy. His father Roberto competed in speed skating at top international level from 1988 to 2002, including all Olympic Winter Games between 1988 and 2002. His older sister Arianna also competes in short track speed skating; she was part of the women's 3000m relay teams that won bronze at both the world and European championships in 2021.

He is law enforcement officer of Guardia di Finanza and member of Gruppi Sportivi Fiamme Gialle since 2019.

References

External links
 Athlete's statistics
 Statistics at the-sports.org
 

1999 births
Living people
Italian male short track speed skaters
Short track speed skaters at the 2022 Winter Olympics
Olympic short track speed skaters of Italy
Olympic silver medalists for Italy
Olympic bronze medalists for Italy
Medalists at the 2022 Winter Olympics
Olympic medalists in short track speed skating